James A. Barker (1857–1943) was a member of the Wisconsin State Assembly and the Wisconsin State Senate.

Biography
Barker was born in Troy, New York in 1857. In 1883 in New York, he married Isabelle C. Webber (1861–1947), with whom he had a son and daughter. In 1910, the family moved to Antigo, Wisconsin.  He died as a result of injuries sustained in a car accident on September 22, 1943, in Antigo.

Career
Barker was a member of the Assembly from 1923 to 1924 for Langlade County and of the Senate from 1925 to 1932. He was a Republican.

References

External links
 The Political Graveyard

1858 births
1943 deaths
Politicians from Troy, New York
People from Antigo, Wisconsin
Republican Party Wisconsin state senators
Republican Party members of the Wisconsin State Assembly